The following is a list of Major League Baseball players, retired or active.

Wi through Wy

References

External links
Last Names starting with W – Baseball-Reference.com

 Wi